Although the first Olympic coin can be traced back to 480 BC, the modern Olympics did not see its first commemoratives until 1951. The original concept of Olympic coins was that the Greeks believed that coins brought the general public closer to the Olympic games.  The premise was that those who could not attend the games could at least have a tangible souvenir of the event.

In 1951, the government of Finland authorized the striking of the first modern Olympic coin, a 500 Markkaa.  The first Winter Games coin that numismatists could add to their collection was in 1964.  An Official Act of the Government of Austria authorized the Austrian Mint to strike a commemorative 50 Schilling coin for the event.

With the exception of Canada's Lucky Loonie program and its 2007 25-cent pieces to commemorate the 2010 Vancouver Olympic Games, it is rare that Olympic coins are minted for circulation. Traditionally, Olympic coins are numismatic coins.
 Please see Summer Olympic coins for details on summer games coins from 1952–1996.
 ''Please see Summer Olympic Coins (2000-present) for 21st Century Olympic coins.

Winter Games

Specifications for Winter Games coins

1964 Innsbruck Olympics

Specifications

Dimensions

1972 Sapporo Olympics

Specifications

Dimensions

1976 Innsbruck Olympics
The games were to be held in Denver, Colorado but after two years of preparation, the city withdrew and Innsbruck was chosen to stage the Games. The Hall Mint, one of the oldest mints in Europe was reopened to strike some of the coins.

Series One
Specifications

Dimensions

NOTE: The Federal Provinces are: Burgenland, Carinthia, Lower Austria, Upper Austria, Salzburg, Styria, Tyrol, Vorallberg and Vienna

Series Two
Specifications

Dimensions

Series Three 
Specifications

Dimensions

Series Four 
Specifications

Dimensions

1984 Sarajevo Olympics
At the time, Sarajevo was the second largest city to host the Olympic Winter Games. These were the first Winter Olympic Games that featured gold coins. Marja-Liisa Haemaelaeinen of Finland was the first woman to win three gold medals in cross country skiing. Katarina Witt won her first Olympic gold medal in Figure Skating, and figure skating duo Jayne Torvill and Christopher Dean won the Gold Medal, and performed to the music of Ravel's Bolero.

100 Dinara
The dimensions are the same for all the 100 Dinara coins. Each series of coins had the same themes: Culture and History, Ice Sports, and Snow Sports.
 Dimensions

The artists for all Reverse Designs were Nebojsa Mitric, Dragisa Andric, Dragomir Mileusnic, Djordje Jovanovic, and Ljubisa Mancic. The artist for all Obverse Designs was Nebojsa Mitric.
 Specifications

250 Dinara
The dimensions are the same for all the 250 Dinara coins. Each series of coins had the same themes: Culture and History, Ice Sports, and Snow Sports.
 Dimensions

The artists for all Reverse Designs were Nebojsa Mitric, Dragisa Andric, Dragomir Mileusnic, Djordje Jovanovic, and Ljubisa Mancic. The artist for all Obverse Designs was Nebojsa Mitric.
 Specifications

500 Dinara
The dimensions are the same for all the 500 Dinara coins. Each series of coins had the same themes: Culture and History, Ice Sports, and Snow Sports.
 Dimensions

The artists for all Reverse Designs were Nebojsa Mitric, Dragisa Andric, Dragomir Mileusnic, Djordje Jovanovic, and Ljubisa Mancic. The artist for all Obverse Designs was Nebojsa Mitric.
 Specifications

5000 Dinara
The dimensions are the same for all the 5000 Dinara coins.
 Dimensions

The artists for all Reverse Designs were Nebojsa Mitric, Dragisa Andric, Dragomir Mileusnic, Djordje Jovanovic, and Ljubisa Mancic. The artist for all Obverse Designs was Nebojsa Mitric.
 Specifications

1988 Calgary Olympics 
Heading into the 1980s, the Olympics would return to Canada. The city of Calgary would host the 1988 Winter Olympics.  Starting in 1985, the Federal Government, under the leadership of then-Prime Minister Brian Mulroney, issued a ten coin set to help finance and commemorate the Olympic games.  In similar style to the Montreal Olympics, the RCM would introduce coins with a face value that had never been used before. Said coins would feature a $20 face value.  These coins were issued in Proof quality only, and were sold with the partnership of the Royal Bank of Canada.  Unlike the Montreal coins, mintage was limited to 5,000,000 coins and this would mark the first time that any silver coin had edge lettering on it.  Said lettering was 'XV OLYMPIC WINTER GAMES – JEUX D'OLYMPIQUES D'HIVER.'

20 Dollars

One Hundred Dollars Gold

1992 Albertville Olympics
The Albertville Olympics were the third Olympic Winter games held in France. To commemorate the event, the Government of France authorized the striking of ten gold and nine silver coins.

100 Francs
 Dimensions

 Specifications

500 Francs
 Dimensions

 Specifications

1998 Nagano Olympics

Series One

Series Two

Series Three

2002 Salt Lake City Olympics

One Dollar
Due to the abject failure of the 1996 program, this year's coins were limited to one silver and one gold piece each.

Five Dollars

2006 Turin Games
A total of 11 coins were minted for the Turin Olympic Games. There were five gold coins and six silver coins. The Silver coins feature the complete line-up of sterling silver coins that have been issued by the Italian State Mint (IPZS) to highlight six of the major disciplines that will be held during the XX Olympic Winter Games Torino 2006. Each coin is struck in proof finish.

Base Metal Coins

Silver Coins
Five Euros

Ten Euros

Gold Coin
Fifty Euros

2010 Vancouver Olympics
The Royal Canadian Mint held a press conference in Calgary, Alberta to announce the release of the Vancouver Olympic commemorative coins. The newest denomination for the Vancouver Olympic coins is twenty-five dollars. The twenty-five dollar coins are the first Modern Olympic coins ever to have a hologram on the reverse. The RCM plans to release 12 twenty-five dollar coins, 10 seventy-five dollar coins, 3 14-karat coins, and 4 one kilogram coins (two in silver, two in gold).

With regards to the circulation coins, one of the novelties is that D.G. Regina will be removed from the Queen's effigy, making the 25-cent coins the first "godless circulating coins" since the 1911 issue of King George V. The first circulating $1 coin will be dated 2008 but the obverse will be the standard effigy of Queen Elizabeth II by Susanna Blunt with the wording "ELIZABETH II" and "D.G. REGINA" with the Circle M privy mark.

Twenty-Five Cents
Specifications

There have been a couple of circulation mules in this series. 2007 Paralympic wheelchair curling and 2009 bobsleigh

Details

Mascot Coins

One Dollar

Twenty-Five Dollars
Specifications

Dimensions

Seventy-Five Dollars
Specifications

Dimensions

Two Hundred and Fifty Dollars
Specifications

Dimensions

Three Hundred Dollars
Specifications

Dimensions

Two Thousand Five Hundred Dollars
Specifications

Dimensions

Bullion Coins 
The Royal Canadian Mint and the International Olympic Committee have reached an agreement on Olympic Gold and Silver Maple Leaf coins. The announcement was made on August 3, 2007 and the agreement allows the RCM to strike bullion coins with the emblems of the 2010 Olympic and Paralympic Games. The issue will consist of two coins: one Gold Maple Leaf coin and a Canadian Silver Maple Leaf coin and both coins will feature the date of 2008. The new agreement means that the RCM is now selling Olympic coins through all of its major business lines: bullion, circulation, numismatics.

2014 Sochi Olympics

Commemorative Coins of Base Metals
Specifications

Details

Commemorative Coins of Precious Metals

Investment Coins

2018 PyeongChang Olympics

Commemorative coins of base metals

References 

Olympics, Winter
Coins, Modern
+